The Nordic Council of the Deaf is a non-partisan and non-religious association whose mission is to work and raise awareness of the linguistic and cultural interests of the deaf in the Nordic countries. It was founded in Copenhagen, Denmark, in 1907 and met irregularly until the 1950s. The organization changed its name to the Cooperation of the Nordic Associations of the Deaf in 1960, later becoming the Nordic Council of the Deaf in 1972.

The council's members are the respective national associations of the deaf in the Nordic countries:
 Denmark (Danish Deaf Association)
 Faroe Islands
 Finland
 Greenland
 Iceland (Icelandic Association of the Deaf)
 Norway (Norwegian Association of the Deaf)
 Sweden

The council meets twice a year. Two representatives from each country attend the meetings. Member countries take turns holding the presidency for four years. Every four years, a cultural festival is organized and the host country is changed.

A key issue for the council is to work for equality and participation of the Nordic deaf in society, which can be realized when sign language has a strong position in society.

The organization views different national sign languages, which have been used for hundreds of years in the region, as an irreplaceable part of Nordic linguistic diversity.

The Nordic Deaf Youth Council is its sister organization.

See also 
 Danish sign language
 Deaf rights
 Finland-Swedish sign language
 Finnish sign language
 Icelandic sign language
 Deafness in Iceland
 Norwegian sign language
 Swedish sign language

References 

Deafness organizations
Nordic organizations
Deaf culture in Denmark
Deaf culture in Finland
Deaf culture in Iceland
Deaf culture in Norway
Deaf culture in Sweden